is a railway station on the Kyūdai Main Line operated by JR Kyushu in Hita, Ōita, Japan. This station is practically a terminal station of Hitahikosan Line.

History 
In 1915, the Daito Railway Co. opened the 22 km Oita - Onoya section. The company was nationalised in 1922, and westerly extensions were undertaken in stages from 1923 until Amagase was reached in 1933. The section between Kurume and Chikugoyoshi was opened in 1928, and easterly extensions to Amagase opened between 1931 and 1934. With the privatization of Japanese National Railways (JNR), the successor of JGR, on 1 April 1987, the station came under the control of JR Kyushu.

3 March 1934-  Kyūdai Line (Kitayamada Station to Hita Station) opened. The station opened along with the line.
15 November 1934 - Kyūdai Line was extended from this station to Amagase station.
27 June 1937 - Kyūdai Line renamed as Kyūdai Main Line.
1972 -Reconstruction of station building.。
1984 - reconstruction of surround area and the square in front of the station.
1987 
5 February - green window opened.
1 April - JNR division and privatization. The station is inherited by Kyushu Railway Company.
28 March 2015- station building renovated.
2017
5 July - The bridge over the Oita River between Chikugo Oisha and Teruoka was demolished by heavy rain. Sections between Hita Station and Ukiha Station on Kyūdai Main Line and between Hita Station and Soeda Station on Hitahikosan Line were closed.
 18 July 2017 - service between Ukiha and Mitsuoka Stations resumed. The service between Mitsuoka Station and Hita Station was connected by shuttle bus.
14 July 2018 - section between Mitsuoka Station and Hita Station reopened.

Passenger statistics
In fiscal 2016, the station was used by an average of 783 passengers daily (boarding passengers only), and it ranked 193rd among the busiest stations of JR Kyushu.

See also
List of railway stations in Japan

References

External links
Hita (JR Kyushu)

Railway stations in Ōita Prefecture
Railway stations in Japan opened in 1934